The Balinese people are an Austronesian ethnic group native to the Indonesian island of Bali. The Balinese population of 4.2 million (1.7% of Indonesia's population) live mostly on the island of Bali, making up 89% of the island's population. There are also significant populations on the island of Lombok and in the easternmost  regions of Java (e.g. the regency of Banyuwangi).

Origins

The Balinese originated from three periods of migration. The first waves of immigrants came from Java and Kalimantan in prehistoric times and were of Proto-Malay stock. The second wave of Balinese came slowly over the years from Java during the Hindu period. The third and final wave came from Java, between the 15th and 16th centuries, about the same time as the conversion to Islam in Java, causing aristocrats and peasants to flee to Bali after the collapse of the Javanese Hindu Majapahit Empire in order to escape Mataram's Islamic conversion. This in turn reshaped the Balinese culture into a syncretic form of classical Javanese culture mixed with many Balinese elements.

A DNA study in 2005 by Karafet et al., found that 12% of Balinese Y-chromosomes are of likely Indian origin, while 84% are of likely Austronesian origin, and 2% of likely Melanesian origin. According to a recent genetic study, Balinese, together with Javanese and Sundanese, has almost an equal ratio of genetic marker shared between Austronesian and Austroasiatic heritages.

Culture

Balinese culture is a mix of Balinese Hindu-Buddhist religion and Balinese customs. It is perhaps most known for its dance, drama and sculpture. The island is also known for its Wayang kulit or Shadow play theatre. Even in rural and neglected villages, beautiful temples are a common sight; and so are skilful gamelan players and talented actors. Even layered pieces of palm leaf and neat fruit arrangements made as offerings by Balinese women have an artistic side to them. According to Mexican art historian José Miguel Covarrubias, works of art made by amateur Balinese artists are regarded as a form of spiritual offering, and therefore these artists do not care about recognition of their works. Balinese artists are also skilled in duplicating artworks such as carvings that resemble Chinese deities or decorating vehicles based on what is seen in foreign magazines.

The culture is noted for its use of the gamelan in music and various traditional events of Balinese society. Each type of music is designated for a specific type of event. For example, music for a piodalan (birthday celebration) is different from music used for a metatah (teeth grinding) ceremony, just as it is for weddings, Ngaben (cremation of the dead ceremony), Melasti (purification ritual) and so forth. The diverse types of gamelan are also specified according to the different types of dance in Bali. According to Walter Spies, the art of dancing is an integral part of Balinese life as well as an endless critical element in a series of ceremonies or for personal interests.

Traditionally, displaying female breasts is not considered immodest. Balinese women can often be seen with bared chests; however, a display of the thigh is considered immodest. In modern Bali, these customs are normally not strictly observed, but visitors to Balinese temples are advised to cover their legs.

In the Balinese naming system, a person's rank of birth or caste is reflected in the name.

Puputan

A puputan is an act of mass suicide through frontal assaults in battle and was first noted by the Dutch during the colonization of Bali. The latest act of puputan was during the Indonesian War of Independence, with Lt. Colonel I Gusti Ngurah Rai as the leader in the Battle of Margarana. The airport in Bali is named after him in commemoration.

Religion

The vast majority of the Balinese believe in Agama Tirta, "holy-water religion". It is a part of Hinduism. Travelling Indian priests are said to have introduced the people to the sacred literature of Hinduism and Buddhism centuries ago. The people accepted it and combined it with their own pre-Hindu mythologies. The Balinese from before the third wave of immigration, known as the Bali Aga, are mostly not followers of Agama Tirta, but retain their own animist traditions.

 
Wet-rice agriculture is a mainstay of Balinese food production. This system of agriculture is extremely water-intensive, and requires a substantial network of irrigation to be effective as a subsistence strategy in Bali. A system of irrigation networks (subak) exists to redistribute access to water in Bali. This network of both underground tunnels (weirs) and canals diverts water from natural water sources into the wet-rice cultivation fields utilized by Balinese farmers to grow their staple crop.

The system of cooperative water redistribution is tied to religious and cultural practices among the Balinese, and represents an economic system based on mutual obligation, and managed by the personnel of the water temples (Pura Tirta). Religious officials from these water temples exert spiritual and cultural pressure on the participants in this system and ensure its continuation. These water temples are largely located at loci of the irrigation networks and manage the distribution of water from the mountainous water sources of the island to lowland areas where water is too scarce for natural cultivation of rice.

There is evidence this system developed as early as the 11th century CE and has been in continuous use since that time. Genetic evidence indicates that this system spread along kinship lines as the original farming villagers of Bali spread from areas where wet-rice farming originated to less climatically favorable areas of the island. The cultural prestige of certain Pura Titra largely correlates to their position within the subak system, with temples located at major water sources having significant cultural influence. Royalty has associated themselves with major temples of this type, to link their own prestige with that of the Pura Titra, and have taken part in the operations of water temples as a means of gaining influence in society.

This system of physical infrastructure represents a durable network of belief which encourages its continuation by the people who participate and provides a levelling mechanism where people who would otherwise be incapable of participating in wet-rice agriculture to take part in the same subsistence activities as those who live in regions more naturally supportive of water-intensive crop growth.

Festivals

Balinese people celebrate multiple festivals, including the Kuta Carnival, the Sanur Village Festival, and the Bali Kite Festival, where participants fly fish-, bird-, and leaf-shaped kites while an orchestra plays traditional music.

See also

 Bali Kingdom
 Balinese caste system
 Balinese Kshatriya
 Nyepi
 Galungan
 Sanghyang
 Kecak
 Canang sari

References

 
Ethnic groups in Indonesia
Hindu ethnic groups
Balinese culture
Ethnoreligious groups in Asia
Hindu communities
Ethnic groups in Southeast Asia
Indigenous peoples of Southeast Asia